Covenant Classical School is a classical Christian school in Fort Worth, Texas. It offers education for K–12 and aims to "train students to live and think according to a biblical, Christ-centered worldview." It was founded in 1999, and is accredited by the Southern Association of Colleges and Schools. As of 2021, it had 433 students.

The Covenant Classical Cavaliers compete in the Texas Association of Private and Parochial Schools as a 2A school. The six-man football team won the Division III state title in 2021.

References

External links
 

1999 establishments in Texas
Christian schools in Texas
Classical Christian schools
Educational institutions established in 1999
High schools in Fort Worth, Texas
Private high schools in Texas